is a railway station in Adachi, Tokyo, Japan, operated by East Japan Railway Company (JR East) and the Tokyo subway operator Tokyo Metro.

Lines
Ayase Station is served by the following two lines.
 JR East Joban Line
 Tokyo Metro Chiyoda Line

The official boundary between the Joban Line and Chiyoda Line is located east of Ayase Station, past the turnoff for the Kita-Ayase branch of the Chiyoda Line. However, the segment of the Chiyoda Line between Ayase and Kita-Senju Station is treated as part of the Joban Line for fare calculation purposes when passengers do not travel on Tokyo Metro beyond Kita-Senju.

Ayase Station also serves as a turnaround point for the Odakyu 60000 series MSE Romancecar service through the Chiyoda Line, and is sometimes used as a delivery point for Tokyo Metro trainsets by rail; JR Freight transports the trainsets to Ayase during midnight hours, where Tokyo Metro takes delivery and hauls them to the nearby Ayase depot.

Station layout 
The stations has a side platform serving one track and two island platforms serving three tracks, and a rectangular cut out for Kita Ayase trains on a fourth track. It is the only station in the Tokyo Metro network to have a "Platform 0".

Platforms

Platform 2/3 is used for terminating and starting trains. Platform 0 is exclusively used for 3-car trains.

History

April 1, 1943: Ayase Station opened as a station on the Japanese Government Railways (JGR) (later Japanese National Railways) Joban Line.
April 20, 1971: The Teito Rapid Transit Authority (TRTA) Chiyoda Line started operation and replaced Joban Line local service between Kita-Senju and Ayase. TRTA assumed management of the station from JNR.
December 20, 1979: The Kita-Ayase Branch Line opened.
April 1, 2004: TRTA was privatized as Tokyo Metro.

Passenger statistics
In fiscal 2015, the station was used by an average of 440,825 passengers daily (combined Tokyo Metro and JR East passengers). The passenger figures for previous years are as shown below.

Surrounding area
 Tokyo Detention House
 Tokyo Kohoku High School
 Higashi-Ayase Junior High School
 Ayase Elementary School
 Ayase River
 Higashi Ayase park

See also
 List of railway stations in Japan

References

External links

 JR East station information 
 Tokyo Metro station information 

Tokyo Metro Chiyoda Line
Jōban Line
Stations of East Japan Railway Company
Stations of Tokyo Metro
Railway stations in Tokyo
Railway stations in Japan opened in 1943